Tawia Adamafio (born Joseph Tawia Adams) was a Ghanaian minister in the Nkrumah government during the first republic of Ghana.

Politics
Adamafio was a member of the Convention People's Party and rose to become its General Secretary. In 1960, he was appointed the Information and Broadcasting Minister by Nkrumah. He was also Minister for Presidential Affairs concurrently. This was an influential position in the government at the time.

1963 trial
Adamafio was one of the close associates of Kwame Nkrumah who stood trial for treason following the Kulungugu grenade attempt on his life. Adamafio and others were freed after the first trial but was eventually found guilty following a second trial by a pro-government panel. The trial judges were Kobina Arku Korsah, at the time the Chief Justice of Ghana and two Supreme Court judges, William Van Lare and Edward Akufo-Addo who later became Chief Justice of Ghana and then President of Ghana during the second republic. They were all sacked by Nkrumah following the acquittal of Adamafio.

Publications

References

Living people
Information ministers of Ghana
Convention People's Party (Ghana) politicians
Year of birth missing (living people)
Ghanaian MPs 1956–1965